West Palm Beach Municipal Stadium, referred to as "Municipal Stadium," was a baseball park in the southeastern United States, in West Palm Beach, Florida. Located at 755 Hank Aaron Drive, it was the long-time spring training home for the Milwaukee and Atlanta Braves and Montreal Expos. The Braves played spring training games at the stadium from 1963 to 1997, while the Expos played there from 1969 to 1972 and from 1981 to 1997.

The stadium was constructed in 1962 to replace midtown Connie Mack Field, which had been the West Palm Beach spring training home of the Philadelphia and Kansas City Athletics from 1946 to 1962.

The first game was played on Saturday, March 9, 1963, under overcast skies and extremely high winds which blew sand from the outfield areas, directly toward seating area, which were not as yet totally landscaped at that time. Mayor C. Ben Holleman threw out the first ball and the Kansas City Athletics defeated the Milwaukee Braves 3–0 in front of a medium-sized crowd of 3,265 fans. Warren Spahn started for Milwaukee and was the losing pitcher.

The ballpark later hosted the 1982 and 1992 Florida State League All-Star Games.

Atlanta and Montreal played their final spring training game at the ballpark on Wednesday March 26, 1997, which saw Montreal come through with a 2–0 victory.

The stadium was later demolished in 2002 and there is nothing to mark its former place, which is now covered by a Home Depot location.

West Palm Beach would not see spring training again until 2017, with the opening of The Ballpark of the Palm Beaches, which is the spring training home of the Houston Astros and Washington Nationals.

References

Atlanta Braves spring training venues
Florida State League ballparks
Milwaukee Braves spring training venues
Defunct minor league baseball venues
Montreal Expos spring training venues
Defunct baseball venues in the United States
Grapefruit League venues
Baseball venues in Florida
Spring training ballparks
Buildings and structures in West Palm Beach, Florida
Sports venues in Palm Beach County, Florida
1963 establishments in Florida
Sports venues completed in 1963
2002 disestablishments in Florida
Sports venues demolished in 2002
Demolished sports venues in Florida